Cerithium scabridum is a species of sea snail, a marine gastropod mollusk in the family Cerithiidae.

Description
The shell size varies between 10 mm and 25 mm.

Distribution
This species is distributed in the Red Sea, the Persian Gulf, the Arabian Sea and the Mediterranean Sea.

References

External links
 

Cerithiidae
Gastropods described in 1848